Hartmut Keyler (born 29 June 1936) is a German architect who served as a member of the World Scout Committee, as well as a member of the European Scout Committee.

Professional career 
Keyler was born in Esslingen am Neckar, and attended school in Esslingen, Korntal and Munich. From 1953 to 1955 he was apprenticed as a carpenter. Beginning in 1955, Keyler studied architecture at the Staatsbauschule München (today: Munich University of Applied Sciences). Since 1959, he works as freelance architect in Munich.

Keyler became a member of Bund Deutscher Architekten and Deutscher Werkbund in 1971. In 1994, he was appointed to the Bayerische Akademie Ländlicher Raum.

Scouting 
Being a Scout in the Christliche Pfadfinderschaft Deutschlands and the Verband Christlicher Pfadfinderinnen und Pfadfinder since 1949, Keyler served twice in the European Scout Committee (1968–1972 and 1977–1980) as well as in the World Scout Committee (1971–1975 and 1985–1993). In 1969, he was among the founders of the Deutschsprachige Konferenz der Pfadfinderverbände. He is a member of the World honours and awards committee of the World Organization of the Scout Movement since 2005.

In 1979, Keyler was awarded the 137th Bronze Wolf, the only distinction of the World Organization of the Scout Movement, for exceptional services to world Scouting. He was also a recipient of the Silver World Award.

Works

References

External links

Architects from Munich
Scouting and Guiding in Germany
World Scout Committee members
Recipients of the Bronze Wolf Award
1939 births
Living people